Live at the Lighthouse is a live album by American jazz group the Modern Jazz Quartet recorded by Wally Heider at the Lighthouse Café in 1967 and released on the Atlantic label.

Reception
The Allmusic review stated "This fairly obscure LP by the Modern Jazz Quartet, features fresh material and improvisations that are both swinging and creative".

Track listing
 "The Spiritual" (John Lewis) - 6:00   
 "Baseball" (Lewis) - 4:03   
 "The Shadow of Your Smile" (Johnny Mandel, Paul Francis Webster) - 5:32   
 "Intima" (Miljenko Prohaska) - 4:12   
 "Novamo" (Milt Jackson) - 5:58   
 "For Someone I Love" (Jackson) - 5:02   
 "What's New?" (Bob Haggart) - 6:14

Personnel
Milt Jackson - vibraphone
John Lewis - piano
Percy Heath - bass
Connie Kay - drums

References

Atlantic Records live albums
Modern Jazz Quartet live albums
1967 live albums
Albums produced by Nesuhi Ertegun
Albums recorded at the Lighthouse Café